Fagun Thakrar is an English actress, writer-director, founder, social entrepreneur and activist. Fagun has appeared in several British, American, and Indian cinema, receiving accolades for her performances. In her films, Fagun has starred alongside actors such as Martin Sheen, Donald Sutherland, and Brie Larson. Fagun founded and is the CEO of the Purpose Movie Studio, the studio focus is on creating social impact content to help effect positive change around the globe. As an activist, Fagun Thakrar is involved in many global non-profits. She supports initiatives focused on global health and holistic well-being, and subsequently founded the Creatively Inspired Life Foundation to empower young people through creativity.

Early life
Fagun was born in Leicester, Leicestershire, England. She studied at Beauchamp College in Oadby. Fagun has studied five degrees at internationally renowned universities. Initially Fagun moved to London to study medicine at University College London. Fagun later trained in classical acting at the Royal Central School of Speech and Drama (RCSSD) and the Royal Academy of Dramatic Art (RADA) in London. Fagun obtained another master's degree from the London College of Fashion and she has studied film direction in the United States. Fagun has her fifth degree from the University of Cambridge.

Fagun's educational experience was chronicled in a special segment for ITV News for maintaining her "straight A" record under a particularly challenging course load in high school and college.

Film career

Acting 
Whilst studying, Fagun competed against thousands of contestants and won BBC's Bolly Idol, an adoption of Pop and America idol  after which she was offered her first lead stage role in Precious Bazaar by Samir Bhamra. For her first cinematic role, Fagun starred as Nabeela in the film, Brick Lane, shot on location in London. She then played Mandy Edge for the long running BBC hospital TV series, Holby City.

Fagun's film acting career has focused on projects with deep social awareness.  Her roles include the title part of Zohra and the lead part of Deepa Verma, in the thriller Blood and Curry. Fagun portrayed Rekha opposite Martin Sheen and Kal Penn in the American film Bhopal: Prayer for Rain.

Internationally acclaimed film director, Shekhar Kapur, hand-picked Fagun to perform and lead the entourage on the official red carpet at the Cannes Film festival for the premiere of his movie, Bollywood, The Greatest Love Story Ever Told. Fagun was the first person to perform on the red carpet in the festival's 65-year history.

In addition to her acting credits on film, Fagun has performed in several Shakespeare plays, including as Juliet in Romeo and Juliet.  She has also appeared in commercials representing L'Oréal, IBM and Vodafone.

Writing and directing 
As a writer and director, Fagun uses the power of storytelling through film to educate, entertain, and influence a wide audience. She is particularly drawn to films that shine a light on critical issues and can make positive changes through education and inspiration.

Fagun is currently directing a documentary How Our Brains Are Affected by Meditation. The documentary analyses the intersection between Neuroscience, the Brain and Meditation and documents the neuroscience basis of meditation and its favourable impact on the human brain.

Non-profit activities

Global activism 
In April 2019, Fagun became the Global Ambassador for The International Forum Advocating for Women's Brain and Health, they have an annual meeting that takes place in Zurich, Switzerland. The forum brings together experts and representatives from a wide range of scientific disciplines and various fields of practice contributing to the study and improvement of brain and health. Fagun served as the key-note speaker and master of ceremonies for the 2019 forum. A key highlight of the program was her interview with first humanistic robot, Sophia.

Fagun started her own foundation in January 2017, the Fagun Foundation. It is a non-profit organization dedicated to empowering girls and women across the globe to overcome barriers in their educational, professional and personal lives through the transformative power of creativity. The organisation manages a global network a creative professionals and links women all around the world to help them improve their personal and professional well-being.

Fagun served as the international spokeswoman for SAHARA (South Asian Helpline And Referral Agency), a culturally sensitive organization that supports women in Southern California's growing community of South Asians through personal crises, including domestic violence. Fagun continues to work with The United Nations and Amnesty International, among other global organization.

Community involvement 
In addition to her work with global non-profits, Fagun is also active with local community organizations.  She is a particularly strong proponent of local causes that support the holistic health and wellness within her community.  Fagun is champion of healthy living and regularly shares her expertise in yoga and meditation throughout the world, guiding groups as diverse as disadvantaged children and world leaders.

Style

Red Carpet Icon
Fagun Thakrar has established herself as fashion icon on the red carpet. At the 68th Cannes films festival, she was named best dressed by Gala and by the press. Fagun has been consistently listed as among the best dressed personalities at Cannes since her debut.

Fashion line
Fagun is the head fashion designer of her own line, the Fagun Collection, which features high fashion crystal embroidered clutches and accessories. Her line launched at the 2011 Oscars red carpet with Serena Williams, and has subsequently been a prominent part of other international celebrities' wardrobes.

Accolades
Fagun was awarded the Leicester Arts Achievement Award for her contribution and supporting young people in the arts.

The British Academy of Film and Television Arts (BAFTA) honored Fagun on their selective Newcomers Program, awarded to international rising stars.

References

External links

Interview with MovieScope
Anglotopia Profile

Year of birth missing (living people)
English film actresses
English television actresses
Living people
People from Leicester
Actresses from Leicestershire
Alumni of University College London
Alumni of RADA
English people of Indian descent
English people of Gujarati descent